Joe Starke (born in Toronto, Ontario, Canada) is a Canadian retired professional ice hockey goaltender whose name was engraved on the Stanley Cup with Chicago in 1934. The NHL says he never played in a single National Hockey League game. However, some sources say he played two games on defense for Chicago Black Hawks in 1934. Starke played minor professional hockey for several years.

External links

Buffalo Majors players
Canadian ice hockey goaltenders
Chicago Blackhawks players
Living people
Minneapolis Millers (CHL) players
Pittsburgh Shamrocks players
Philadelphia Arrows players
Ice hockey people from Toronto
Stanley Cup champions
St. Paul Greyhounds players
St. Louis Flyers (AHA) players
Tulsa Oilers (AHA) players
Canadian expatriate ice hockey players in the United States
Year of birth missing (living people)